Soomekh is a surname which is very common among Persian Jews. Notable people with the surname include:

Bahar Soomekh (born 1975), Iranian-born American actress
Saba Soomekh, American professor and writer

Iranian-language surnames
Jewish surnames